The 2019 Liga 2 Final was the final match of the 2019 Liga 2, the 10th season of second-tier competition in Indonesia organised by PT Liga Indonesia Baru, and the third season since it was renamed from the Liga Indonesia Premier Division to the Liga 2. It was played at the Kapten I Wayan Dipta Stadium in Gianyar, Bali on 25 November 2019.

Persik won the match 3–2 to secure their first title in this competition as second-tier and second title overall.

Road to the final

Note: In all results below, the score of the finalist is given first (H: home; A: away).

Match
Times listed below are UTC+8.

Details

References

Liga 2
2019